Trolls World Tour (often named as Trolls 2: World Tour) is a 2020 American computer-animated jukebox musical comedy film produced by DreamWorks Animation and distributed by Universal Pictures, based on the Good Luck Trolls dolls created by Thomas Dam. The sequel to Trolls (2016) and the second installment in the franchise, the film was directed by Walt Dohrn and co-directed by David P. Smith (in his feature directorial debut), from a screenplay by Maya Forbes, Wallace Wolodarsky, Elizabeth Tippet, and the writing team of Jonathan Aibel and Glenn Berger, and a story by Aibel and Berger. The film features an ensemble cast that includes the voices of Anna Kendrick, Justin Timberlake, Rachel Bloom, James Corden, Ron Funches, Kelly Clarkson, Anderson .Paak, Sam Rockwell, George Clinton, and Mary J. Blige. The film follows Poppy and Branch as they discover several more troll tribes that represent music genres other than their own. Troubles arise when the Queen of the Rock tribe plans to overthrow the foreign music genres to unite the trolls under rock music.

A sequel to Trolls was announced in February 2017, with Kendrick and Timberlake returning their roles. Podcasters the McElroy brothers began campaigning for roles in the film in March 2017, with DreamWorks Animation confirmed it would make cameo appearances in September 2018. Much of the new cast were signed in May 2018 to June 2019. The marking custom animation to promote the film was provided from Minimo VFX and Jellyfish Pictures.

Trolls World Tour was released in the United States in a limited number of theaters on April 10, 2020, due to the COVID-19 pandemic and was simultaneously released on video on demand. AMC Theatres subsequently announced they would no longer distribute the studio's films, though this was later reversed after AMC and Universal agreed on a new contract. Like its predecessor, the film received generally positive reviews from critics.
 
A third film is set to be released in theaters on November 17, 2023.

Plot

In the techno kingdom, King Trollex's tribe of Techno Trolls are attending a rave, when Hard Rock Trolls led by Queen Barb arrive and use weaponized guitars to destroy everything. Queen Barb demands Trollex surrender and hand over his "string".

Queen Poppy later receives a letter from Barb, inviting her to bring her "string" to unite the trolls. Former King Peppy explains there were once six magical lyre strings that represented major tribes of music - Pop, Hard Rock, Techno, Funk, Classical, and Country. However, the six tribes took their strings and went their separate ways. Peppy, Branch, and the others don't trust Barb's invitation, but Poppy decides to sneak out with her string, to prove Barb is the same as any other troll. Branch, who is trying to confess his love, and Biggie, who stowed away, accompany her. At the same time, a giraffe-like Pop Troll named Cooper finds old illustrations of trolls his shape, and sets off to find them, eventually getting beamed up into a spaceship.

Meanwhile, Barb sends bounty hunters of smaller music genres to find Poppy, promising to spare the tribe of the successful one. Poppy's group soon discovers the ruins of the Classical tribe's town, Symphonyville. A sentient flute, Pennywhistle, tells them that Barb wants to forcefully unite all trolls under Rock. They then head to Lonesome Flats to warn the centaur-like Country Trolls. Poppy feels their music is too downbeat and decides to try to cheer them up first, despite Branch's reservations. The Pop Trolls wind up imprisoned, but are rescued by a smooth-talking Country Troll named Hickory, who builds them a raft to take them to Vibe City to warn the Funk Trolls. They encounter Chaz, a Smooth Jazz troll, who paralyzes them with his music, until Hickory, using gumdrop earplugs to remain immune, drives him off. Biggie deserts the group, angry that Poppy broke an earlier promise to keep him safe.

The group reaches Vibe City, which turns out to be the spaceship that took Cooper. They reunite with Cooper, who reveals that he is actually the long-lost son of Funk Trolls King Quincy and Queen Essence, and twin brother of their son Prince D. Poppy maintains all trolls are the same, but Prince D explains that Pop Trolls once tried to unite all trolls under Pop, causing the initial split. The Hard Rock Trolls attack the ship, and Poppy's group is ejected to safety. After arguing with Poppy over her refusal to listen, Branch walks off and is captured by Reggaeton and K-Pop trolls, who fight over him until he convinces them to work together with him against Barb.

A repentant Hickory reveals he is actually a Yodel troll, who disguised himself and his brother Dickory as a centaur to steal Poppy's string. He tells Poppy to run, but Barb arrives and captures her. Biggie, meanwhile, returns home to find Pop Village destroyed, and realizes he should have never left Poppy, rallying the other Pop trolls to rescue her.

At Volcano Rock City, Barb forces her captives to attend a concert. She uses the six magic strings on her guitar to turn all her captives to Rock Zombies, including Branch when he and his new friends try to rescue Poppy. Poppy herself seems to have been turned, but then reveals that she used gumdrops to block out the music. She smashes Barb's guitar, restoring the zombies, but the strings are destroyed, ending music and turning all trolls gray.

Cooper hears his heartbeat and starts beatboxing with Prince D, convincing other trolls to make sounds to create a rhythm. Poppy leads everyone into singing together from their hearts, restoring their music, strings and color, including Barb, who accepts Poppy's offer of friendship, while Branch finally confesses his feelings for Poppy, and the trolls all return to Pop Village to celebrate.

Voice cast
 Anna Kendrick as Queen Poppy, the sweet and optimistic Queen of the Pop Trolls and Branch's love interest (later girlfriend).
 Justin Timberlake as Branch, an over-cautious, but good-hearted survivalist Pop Troll who is Poppy's love interest (later boyfriend). 
 Rachel Bloom as Queen Barb, the feisty and misguided Queen of the Hard Rock Trolls.
 James Corden as Biggie, a large, friendly Pop Troll who accompanies Poppy and Branch on their journey.
 Ron Funches as Cooper, a giraffe-like Pop Troll who discovers he is really a long-lost prince of the Funk Trolls.
 Kelly Clarkson as Delta Dawn, the mayor of the centaur-like Country Trolls.
 Anderson .Paak as Prince D, one of the princes of the Funk Trolls and Cooper's twin brother. 
 Sam Rockwell as Hickory, one of the Yodelling Trolls who disguises himself as a Country Troll.
 George Clinton as King Quincy, the King of the Funk Trolls and Cooper and Prince D’s father.
 Mary J. Blige as Queen Essence, the Queen of the Funk Trolls and Cooper and Prince D’s mother.
 Kenan Thompson as Tiny Diamond, a baby glittery Pop Troll and Guy Diamond's rapping newborn son.
 Kunal Nayyar as Guy Diamond, a naked, glittery Pop Troll with a highly auto-tuned voice and Tiny Diamond's single father.
 Icona Pop as Satin and Chenille, twin fashionista Pop Trolls who are conjoined by their hair.
 J Balvin as Tresillo, the leader of the Reggaeton Trolls.
 Flula Borg as Dickory, one of the Yodelling Trolls and Hickory's brother who helped with his Country Troll disguise.
 Ester Dean as Legsly, a Pop Troll who can make her legs grow really long at will.
 Jamie Dornan as Chaz, the Smooth Jazz Troll.
 Gustavo Dudamel as Trollzart, the ruler and conductor of the butterfly-winged Classical Trolls.
 Ozzy Osbourne as Thrash, the retired King of the Hard Rock Trolls and Barb's semi-senile father who moves around in a wheelchair.
 Anthony Ramos as King Trollex, the kind, upbeat and protective King of the half-fish Techno Trolls.
 Karan Soni as Riff, a Hard Rock Troll and Barb's laid-back drummer.
 Charlyne Yi as Pennywhistle, a small flute who resides with the Classical Trolls.
 Red Velvet as the K-Pop Gang, a group of K-pop Trolls:
 Wendy as Wani, the blue member of the gang.
 Irene as Baby Bun, the pink member of the gang.
 Seulgi as Gomdori, the yellow member of the gang.
 Joy as Ari, the green member of the gang.
 Yeri as Kim-Petit, the purple member of the gang.
 Kevin Michael Richardson as:
 Mr. Dinkles, Biggie's pet worm.
 Growley Pete, a grumbly-voiced Country Troll and Delta Dawn's deputy.
 Sid Fret, a rather dim-witted Hard Rock Troll
 Mr. Dinkles God.
 Walt Dohrn as:
 Smidge, a small, inordinately strong female Pop Troll with a masculine voice.
 Cloud Guy, an eccentric anthropomorphic cloud that serves as the narrator of the opening prologue.
 King Peppy, the former King of the Pop Trolls and Poppy's father. He was previously voiced by Jeffrey Tambor in the previous film.
 Fuzzbert, a Pop Troll whose legs are the only thing visible besides his hair
 Death Metal Dinkles
 Announcer
 Country Troll Baby
 Country Troll Farmer.
 David P. Smith as:
 Country Music Rooster
 Desert Sun
 Eighth Goats
 Licky Bug
 Scrapbook Troll
 Da'Vine Joy Randolph as:
 Bliss Marina, a magenta-colored Techno Troll.
 Sheila B, a flower-faced balloon.
 Betsy Sodaro as Clampers, a young Country Troll who lives in Delta Dawn's hair and has huge teeth.
 Marcella Lentz-Pope as Carol, a seasoned Hard Rock Troll who is often seen eating cheese from a spray can.
 Berenice Amador and Jamila Hache as Marimba and Tambora, two of the Reggaeton Trolls.
 Justin McElroy, Travis McElroy, and Griffin McElroy as Skyscraper Troll, a four-headed Pop Troll where three of his heads are sticking out of his hair alongside the heads' associated arms.
 Justin McElroy also voices a Techno Beat-Drop button that is loyal to King Trollex and a tumbleweed in Country Troll territory.
 Travis McElroy also voices Rocker Tear.
 Griffin McElroy also voices Country Music Tear.
 Christopher Mintz-Plasse as Gristle Jr., the King of the Bergens.
 Zooey Deschanel as Bridget, the Queen of the Bergens and Gristle's wife.

Production
On February 28, 2017, Universal Pictures and DreamWorks Animation announced a sequel to the 2016 film Trolls, with Anna Kendrick and Justin Timberlake reprising their roles as Poppy and Branch.

In March 2017, podcasters the McElroy brothers began campaigning for roles in the film via a podcast titled "The McElroy Brothers Will Be in Trolls World Tour". Following the campaign's success, DreamWorks confirmed in September 2018 that the McElroy brothers would make cameo appearances in World Tour.

Sam Rockwell, Chance the Rapper, Anthony Ramos, Jamie Dornan and Flula Borg were added to the cast in May 2018. Corden, Icona Pop, Funches, and Nayyar returned to reprise their roles. On June 12, 2018, the film was retitled as Trolls World Tour. In October 2018, it was confirmed that Kelly Clarkson had joined the cast, and will perform an original song. In June 2019, along with promotional posters, new cast members have been announced, which include: J Balvin, Mary J. Blige, Rachel Bloom, George Clinton, Ester Dean and Gustavo Dudamel.

The marking custom animation to promote the film was provided from Minimo VFX & Jellyfish Pictures, who would do the animation for Spirit Untamed and have produced assets for The Boss Baby: Family Business and The Bad Guys.

Music 

Along with Timberlake, Clarkson, .Paak, Blige and Clinton, songs are provided by Chris Stapleton and SZA.

The first single from the movie's soundtrack, "The Other Side", by Timberlake and SZA, was released on February 26, 2020. The Trolls World Tour: Original Motion Picture Soundtrack was released on March 13, 2020.

Release

Theatrical
Universal Pictures had originally planned to release Trolls World Tour theatrically in the United States on April 10, 2020. It was later pushed up to February 14, 2020 before being pushed back to April 17, 2020. Following the delay of No Time to Die, it was once again pushed up to the original April 10 release date. It was also set to be released on March 20 in the United Kingdom, but due to the COVID-19 pandemic in the United Kingdom, its release date was pushed back to April 6.

On March 17, Universal announced that the film would be released simultaneously in theaters and for digital rental on April 10 in the United States and Canada due to the COVID-19 pandemic. By then, Trolls World Tour had only been released in Russia, Singapore, and Malaysia. Other films distributed by the studio, such as The Invisible Man and The Hunt were also released digitally before the end of the usual 90-day theatrical run.

As the lockdown measures receded, the film was released in three Santikos Theatres locations in San Antonio, Texas on May 1, 2020. Theatres in Hong Kong also started to show the film a week later on May 8, 2020. In Russia the film was made available in IMAX cinemas. In Austria and the Netherlands, it was released in both 4DX and Dolby Cinema.

Home media
Trolls World Tour was made available for an early digital purchase on June 23, 2020. The film was released on DVD, Blu-ray, and Ultra HD Blu-ray by Universal Pictures Home Entertainment on July 7, 2020. All releases include an original short film entitled "Tiny Diamond Goes Back to School". By July 19, the film had totaled $23.6 million worth of DVD and Blu-ray sales. The movie was also available to stream on the streaming service Peacock.

Controversy
In response to Universal releasing the film without consulting theater owners, as well as comments from NBCUniversal CEO Jeff Shell suggesting that future Universal releases would premiere on streaming simultaneously in theaters, AMC Theatres stated that they would not license films that also premiere at the same time on digital release; "Going forward, AMC will not license any Universal movies in any of our 1,000 theatres globally on these terms." Regal Cinemas followed suit in a statement not just directed at Universal, saying "we will not be showing movies that fail to respect the windows". However, in July 2020, AMC and Universal announced they had come to a deal to shorten the minimum theatrical window to 17 days (down from the usual 90), and that AMC would receive an undisclosed share of subsequent PVOD sales, resulting in a termination of AMC's ban on Universal's films.

The Hollywood Reporter wrote that some of the cast, including Anna Kendrick and Justin Timberlake, were not aware of the film's VOD release, and that their representatives were trying to secure the actors' bonuses they would have received had the film performed well theatrically.

Reception

Box office
In the U.S., the film made about $60,000 in its opening weekend from 25 drive-in theaters, amid extensive movie theater closures due to restrictions targeted at the COVID-19 pandemic. By May 12, despite no official reports, Deadline Hollywood said media outlets including Box Office Mojo had underreported the figures and estimated the film was approaching $1 million from theatrical grosses. By June 7, Deadline said the film had amassed $3.6 million from the domestic box office, and likely had been the first place film every weekend since its release. It continued to play in drive-ins in the following weeks. Box Office Mojo reported the domestic gross at only $450,000 and reported the total worldwide gross at $48 million. The-Numbers.com did not count any domestic gross, and put the worldwide total slightly higher at $49 million.

VOD sales
Following its debut digital streaming weekend, it was reported by FandangoNow that the film had set the record for most streams on a release weekend by the company. The film also finished number one for Amazon Prime, Comcast, Apple TV, Vudu, YouTube, and DirecTV, with Universal reporting it was purchased 10-times more than its previous day-one rental Jurassic World: Fallen Kingdom, which had made $2–3 million on its first day. Altogether, the film made at least $40 million over the weekend. Through the first 19 days of release, it was estimated between three and five million people had streamed the film, resulting in about a $95 million gross ($77 million of which went to Universal, more revenue for the studio than the original film made during its entire theatrical run). After three months of release the film remained in the top-five across most services, and occasionally returned to the top spot on Amazon Prime, FandangoNow, and iTunes. By August, IndieWire estimated the film had made about $150 million from rentals.

Deadline Hollywood estimated that due to the film's approximate $95 million production cost, plus another $30 million spent on marketing (although rival studios claim Universal spent more than that, as high as a normal $80–100 million campaign), the film could break-even if 9–12 million people rent the film, resulting in about $200 million in revenue. The Hollywood Reporter wrote that "in the opinion of some industry veterans, [the film] may never make a dime" although "Universal believes it can make $40 million or more in profit from all revenue sources." In October 2020, The Hollywood Reporter said the film was the second-most popular PVOD title amid the COVID-19 pandemic, behind Mulan.

Critical response
On Rotten Tomatoes, the film holds an approval rating of 71% based on 160 reviews. The site's critical consensus reads: "A fun follow-up for fans of the original, Trolls World Tour offers a second helping of colorful animation, infectious energy, and sing-along songs." On Metacritic, the film has a weighted average score of 51 out of 100, based on 35 critics, indicating "mixed or average reviews".

Owen Gleiberman of Variety magazine gave it a mixed review, calling it a "music-drenched fairy tale" and "for all its surface pleasures, it's a likable but underimagined one, with more enthusiasm than surprise and, at the same time, an overprogrammed sense of its own thematic destiny."

Entertainment Weekly gave a mixed review, calling it "Infinity War with lower stakes".

Accolades

Sequel
On April 9, 2020, Justin Timberlake expressed interest in participating in future Trolls films during his Apple Music takeover, "I hope we make, like, seven Trolls movies, because it literally is the gift that keeps on giving". On November 22, 2021, it was announced that a third Trolls film would be released in theaters on November 17, 2023.

References

External links
 
 

2020 films
Trolls (franchise)
2020 computer-animated films
2020s American animated films
American 3D films
American computer-animated films
Films about trolls
Films based on toys
Jukebox musical films
Films scored by Theodore Shapiro
Films with screenplays by Jonathan Aibel and Glenn Berger
DreamWorks Animation animated films
Universal Pictures animated films
Universal Pictures films
2020s children's animated films
Animated films about music and musicians
Animated films based on Norse mythology
2020s English-language films